Sahyadri is a mountain range along the western side of India. It may also refer to:

 DD Sahyadri, an Indian television network
 INS Sahyadri (F49), a Shivalik class frigate
 Sahyadri School, a school in Rajgurunagar